Below is a list of so-called megaprojects that are among the most expensive in U.S. history.

Highways
The following list includes projects to build new highways or improve existing ones, including roadways, bridges, and tunnels. It includes only projects that are underway or completed. Additionally, projects with multiple independent segments (e.g., I-69 Indiana-Texas Extension, Trans-Texas Corridor) are not included, though individual segments may or may not make the list. Costs shown below exclude financing costs.

Rail

See also
 Megaproject

References

Economy-related lists of superlatives
United States transportation-related lists
Public Works, US